Làn Sóng Xanh is a Vietnamese music chart programme. The major popular music award in Vietnam, one of the nation’s biggest music contests. Làn Sóng Xanh launched in 1997 by the Voice of Ho Chi Minh City radio station. Winning the award distinguishes the most successful V-Pop singers.

References

External links
 

1997 radio programme debuts
Vietnamese music awards
Mass media in Ho Chi Minh City